Timeline of the COVID-19 pandemic in Northern Ireland may refer to:

Timeline of the COVID-19 pandemic in Northern Ireland (2020)
Timeline of the COVID-19 pandemic in Northern Ireland (2021)
Timeline of the COVID-19 pandemic in Northern Ireland (2022)

Northern Ireland